George Whitfield Scranton (May 11, 1811 – March 24, 1861) was an American industrialist and politician, a Republican member of the U.S. House of Representatives from Pennsylvania from March 4, 1859, until his death in 1861. Moving to Pennsylvania in the late 1830s to establish an iron furnace, he and his brother Selden T. Scranton are considered among the founders of the city of Scranton, Pennsylvania, named for their family. They and two partners established what became known as the Iron & Coal Company. They developed a method of producing T-rails for constructing railroad track, which previously had been imported from England. The innovation led to a boom in production of track and construction of railroads.

Scranton became a major industrialist, also leading the Delaware, Lackawanna and Western Railroad, which depended on the iron industry.

After his death, his cousin Joseph H. Scranton, an early investor who had moved to this city, became president and the cousin's son, William Walker Scranton, became general manager of the Iron & Coal Company. W.W. Scranton managed the company during and after the Scranton General Strike of 1877, founding the Lackawanna Steel Company.

Early life
George Scranton was born in Madison, Connecticut. Among his siblings was his brother Selden T. Scranton. He attended Lee’s Academy. He moved to Belvidere, New Jersey, in 1828 and became a teamster. He and his brother both worked at Oxford Furnace, an iron manufacturing factory.

Career

Learning of extensive iron and coal deposits in northeast Pennsylvania, the two Scranton brothers became interested in potential for new industry and moved to this area of mining "hard" or anthracite coal. Together with Sanford Grant and Philip H. Mattes, they formed the firm of Scrantons, Grant & Company. Mattes was head of a branch of a bank in Easton, Pennsylvania, and helped gain financing.

In 1839 Scranton started to manufacture iron, and began experimenting with the practicability of smelting ore by means of "hard" or anthracite coal in Slocum Hollow (now Scranton, Pennsylvania). This area was developing as the center of extensive mining of anthracite coal.

Scranton was the founder of the Lackawanna Iron & Coal Company, named after the river. He and his brother Selden, together with Grant and Mattes, are considered founders of the city of Scranton, named after the Scranton family.  He also constructed the Northumberland division of the Lackawanna Railroad, helping to create the Delaware, Lackawanna and Western Railroad. He was the president of two railroad companies.

In 1858 Selden Scranton returned to Oxford Furnace in New Jersey.

Politics

Scranton was elected to Congress from Pennsylvania as a Republican in 1858 to the 36th Congress and served from March 4, 1859, until his death in Scranton on March 24, 1861.

Personal life

In 1847, his cousin Joseph A. Scranton moved with his second wife and young family to this corner of Pennsylvania. One of his sons, William Walker Scranton, went to Yale in the family tradition, later becoming general manager of the Lackawanna Iron & Coal company. He led the company during the extensive protests and action in the city in 1877 during the Scranton General Strike.

See also

List of United States Congress members who died in office (1790–1899)

References

Sources

External links

 

1811 births
1861 deaths
People from Madison, Connecticut
Republican Party members of the United States House of Representatives from Pennsylvania
American steel industry businesspeople
American manufacturing businesspeople
Scranton, Pennsylvania
People from Belvidere, New Jersey
19th-century American politicians
19th-century American railroad executives